The Public Enterprise for Managing and Protection of the Multipurpose Area Jasen or just Reservе Jasen is a nature reserve in North Macedonia. It was turned into a protected nature reserve in 2010 (part of it was declared a reserve as far back as 1958) and is situated only 15 km from Skopje. The lowest point is the still uncharted canyon lake Matka. The highest point is Mount Karadzica with a height of almost .

The park is home to the endangered Eurasian lynx and the rare Balkan chamois.

History
The territory of today's Public Enterprise for Managing and Protection of the Multipurpose Area Jasen was already in the period from 1958 to 1960 declared to be a reserve. The declaration had as goal the protection of the fauna, floral, biological, geological, natural and hydrological rarities.

External links 

Official website of the park
Yassen (Jasen) Reserve, Macedonia - Western Balkans Geotourism Mapguide, National Geographic

Geography of North Macedonia